Canapville is the name of several communes in Normandy, France:

Canapville, Calvados
Canapville, Orne